"Come Out of That Grave (Resurrection Power)" is a song by Bethel Music and Brandon Lake, which was released as a promotional single from Bethel Music's twelfth live album, Revival's in the Air (2020), on May 25, 2020. The song was written by Brian Johnson and Chris Davenport. Brian Johnson and Joel Taylor handled the production of the song.

"Come Out of That Grave (Resurrection Power)" peaked at No. 38 on the US Hot Christian Songs chart.

Background
On May 25, 2020, Bethel Music released "Come Out of That Grave (Resurrection Power)" as the first of four cascading promotional singles towards the release of Revival's in the Air on May 29, 2020, with the accompanying music video.

Composition

Commercial performance
"Come Out of That Grave (Resurrection Power)" made its debut at number 38 on Billboard's Hot Christian Songs chart dated June 13, 2020. It spent a total of two consecutive weeks on the Hot Christian Songs Chart.

Music video
Bethel Music released the live music video of "Come Out of That Grave (Resurrection Power)" with Brandon Lake leading the song during the WorshipU 2019 conference held at Bethel Church through their YouTube channel on March 6, 2020.

Charts

References

External links
  on PraiseCharts

2020 songs
Bethel Music songs
Brandon Lake songs